Arild Andresen (born 30 November 1967) is a Norwegian film director born in Kristiansand. He first directed advertisements, but later made his way into TV and film.

Awards and recognition 
In 2010, Andresen was awarded the Norwegian cinema managers' "Sølvklumpen" award for his film Liverpool Goolie.

In 2012, his Company Orheim won the top Dragon Award for Best Nordic Film at the Gothenburg Film Festival.

References

External links

Living people
1967 births
Norwegian film directors
People from Kristiansand
Norwegian television directors